Senator Ridder may refer to:

Robert Ridder (politician) (1927–2021), Washington State Senate
Ruthe Ridder (born 1929), Washington State Senate